Amide reduction is a reaction in organic synthesis where an amide is reduced to either an amine or an aldehyde functional group.

Catalytic hydrogenation
Catalytic hydrogenation can be used to reduce amides to amines; however, the process often requires high hydrogenation pressures and reaction temperatures to be effective (i.e. often requiring pressures above 197 atm and temperatures exceeding 200 °C). Selective catalysts for the reaction include copper chromite, rhenium trioxide and rhenium(VII) oxide or bimetallic catalyst.

Non-catalytic routes to amines
Reducing agents able to effect this reaction include metal hydrides such as lithium aluminium hydride, or lithium borohydride in mixed solvents of tetrahydrofuran and methanol.

Noncatalytic routes to aldehydes
N,N-disubstituted amides can be reduced to aldehydes by using an excess of the amide:
R(CO)NRR'  + LiAlH4 →  RCHO + HNRR'

With further reduction the alcohol is obtained.

Some amides can be reduced to aldehydes in the Sonn-Müller method.

Hydrosilylation
A well known method for amide reduction is hydrosilylation with silyl hydrides and a suitable catalyst based on Rh, Ru, Pt, Pd, Ir, Os, Re, Mn, Mo, In, or Ti.

Iron catalysis by triiron dodecacarbonyl in combination with polymethylhydrosiloxane has been reported.

References

External links
 Amide reduction @ organic-chemistry.org

Organic redox reactions